Sheykh Zoveyr (also known as Sheykh ‘Abdollāh and Sheykh Zeybak) is a village in Seyyed Abbas Rural District, Shavur District, Shush County, Khuzestan Province, Iran. At the 2006 census, its population was 272, in 38 families.

References 

Populated places in Shush County